Pitsiturnaus is an ice hockey tournament held in Rauma, Finland. It is held around the time of the Pitsiviikko. The tournament has been played since 1993. The tournament is held in the Kivikylän Areena.

Participating teams

2022

History 
The participants of the tournament have traditionally been Rauma Lukko, Porin Ässät and TPS. Rauman Lukko has the most titles in the tournament, having won it ten times. The first foreign team in the tournament was the Russian CSK VVS Samara in 1999. The only foreign winner is from 2002, when the Russian HC CSKA Moscow won the tournament. The same team also took part in the tournament in 2003, when Lukko defeated them in the final. In both years, the Moscow team was coached by Vasily Tikhonov, the former coach of Ässät and Lukko.

In 2006, the tournament was not played due to renovations at the arena, but at that time the opening tournament of Äijänsuo was played, where HC Pardubice won over Ässät in the final 7–3. Lukko came in third after defeating the Blues 5-4.

Since 2010, the tournament has been held after Pitsiviikko, as the rules of the Finnish Champions League prohibit practice games in July, at the end of which Pitsiviikko is. Today, the Pitsiturnaus is played on the first Friday in August.

Format 
Six teams will take part in the tournament. Teams are drawn into divisions of three teams where they play once against each other. The top two from both divisions will advance to the semi-finals, with the winners going to the finals. The playing time in the first round and semi-finals is 2x15 min and in the final 2x20 min. Bronze games are not played.

Ässät and Lukko are always placed into the same division.

Tournament champions 
List of champions:

References 

Ice hockey tournaments
Ice hockey tournaments in Europe
Sport in Satakunta
Lukko